Walter Evans may refer to:

Sportsmen
Walter Rice Evans (1863–1909), Welsh rugby union player
Walter Evans (footballer, born 1867) (1867–1897), Aston Villa F.C. and Wales international footballer
Walter Evans (Bilbao footballer) (fl. 1901–1904), English footballer who played as a striker for Athletic Club
Allan Evans (Australian sportsman) (Walter Allan Evans, 1897–1955), Western Australian cricketer and footballer

Other people
Walter Evans (American politician) (1842–1923), American judge and politician from Kentucky
Walter Jenkin Evans (1856–1927), Welsh Presbyterian academic and writer
Walter Howard Evans (1870–1959), judge for the United States Customs Court
Sir Walter Evans, 1st Baronet (1872–1954), English hydraulic engineer, politician and public servant
Walter R. Evans (1920–1999), American control theorist

See also
Walter Evans Edge (1873–1956), American governor of New Jersey, 1917–1919, 1944–1947
Walter Evans-Wentz (1878–1965), American anthropologist